The following writers contributed to the Oxford English Dictionary.

Chief editors

Other contributors 

 Hucks Gibbs, 1st Baron Aldenham
 Sir William Anson, 3rd Baronet
 George Latimer Apperson
 Edward Arber
 John Christopher Atkinson
 Clarence Barnhart
 James Britten
 Thomas Nadauld Brushfield
 Ingram Bywater
 Robert William Chapman (scholar)
 Albert Huntington Chester
 Andrew Clark (priest)
 Edward Dowden
 Thomas Messinger Drown
 Robert Druitt
 Jonathan Eastwood
 Robinson Ellis
 Frederick Thomas Elworthy
 Daniel Silvan Evans
 Wendell Phillips Garrison
 Peter Gilliver
 Alexander Balloch Grosart
 Fitzedward Hall
 Beatrice Harraden
 Joyce Hawkins
 William Carew Hazlitt
 Richard Oliver Heslop
 William Ballantyne Hodgson
 Clement Mansfield Ingleby
 Benjamin Daydon Jackson
 Benjamin Jowett
 Thomas Hewitt Key
 Friedrich Kluge
 Marghanita Laski
 John Knox Laughton
 John Wickham Legg
 Henry Liddell
 Augustus Edward Hough Love
 Falconer Madan
 Frederic William Maitland
 Francis March
 David Samuel Margoliouth
 George Perkins Marsh
 Paul Meyer (philologist)
 William Chester Minor
 William Morfill
 Anna Morpurgo Davies
 Edward Ellis Morris
 Richard Morris (philologist)
 Horatio Mosley Moule
 Max Müller
 H. J. R. Murray
 Margaret Murray
 Arthur Napier
 Alfred Newton
 Edward Nicholson (librarian)
 Edward Peacock (antiquary)
 Flinders Petrie
 John Thompson Platts
 Sir Frederick Pollock, 3rd Baronet
 Frederick York Powell
 L. F. Powell
 Hereward Thimbleby Price
 Richard Bissell Prosser
 Philip Pye-Smith
 John Rhys
 John Richardson (naturalist)
 Charles Pierre Henri Rieu
 Henry Roscoe (chemist)
 William Michael Rossetti
 Jesse Sheidlower
 Walter William Skeat
 William Barclay Squire
 John Stainer
 W. H. Stevenson
 William Stubbs
 Edward Sugden (Methodist)
 Henry Sweet
 Joseph Robson Tanner
 William Turner Thiselton-Dyer
 J. R. R. Tolkien
 Lucy Toulmin Smith
 Paget Toynbee
 Richard Chenevix Trench
 Henry Frederic Turle
 Edward Burnett Tylor
 Herbert Warren
 Hensleigh Wedgwood
 Richard Francis Weymouth
 Richard Grant White
 William Dwight Whitney
 R. J. Whitwell
 Charlotte Mary Yonge
 Henry Yule
 Ghil'ad Zuckermann

References

Oxford English Dictionary
Oxford University Press people
Oxford